Elio Steiner (1904–1965) was an Italian stage and film actor. Steiner appeared in forty films during his career, including The Song of Love (1930), the first Italian sound film.

Selected filmography
 The Golden Vein (1928)
 The Song of Love (1930)
 Assunta Spina (1930)
 The Man with the Claw (1931)
 Before the Jury (1931)
 Pergolesi (1932)
 Giallo (1933)
 Don Pasquale (1940)
 Giarabub (1942)
 La città dolente (1948)
 Black Fire (1951)
 The Phantom Musketeer (1952)
 The Prince with the Red Mask (1955)
 Arrivederci Firenze (1958)

References

External links

Bibliography
 Mancini, Elaine. Struggles of the Italian film industry during fascism, 1930-1935. UMI Research Press, 1985.

1904 births
1965 deaths
Actors from the Metropolitan City of Venice
Italian male film actors
Italian male silent film actors
Italian male stage actors
20th-century Italian male actors